The Captain Whidbey Inn, a lodging and hospitality establishment built in 1907, is located on Whidbey Island at the west end of Penn Cove just outside Coupeville, Washington.  It is part of the National Register of Historic Places listed Central Whidbey Island Historic District.

History
The Captain Whidbey Inn was built in the fall and winter of 1907 from Madrona logs and stone found on-site by Chris Fisher and his son Edward. The post and beam construction, with the log infill, sits intact as originally built. Larry Fisher, Chris Fisher's great-grandson, still  works occasionally on the inn. It was opened in May 1907 as part of a large recreation retreat then-called Still Park. The inn and park were developed by Judge Lester Still. The park also had camping, cabins, horse trails, tennis courts and a warm salt water swimming pool. A collection of pictures from that period remain in a history collection at the inn.

The inn originally contained 15 sleeping rooms upstairs and a large gathering room downstairs with a two-sided fireplace.  The fireplace was faced with native stone; it still forms the central meeting place for the inn. Daily steamers from both Seattle and Everett were the original links to the outside world bringing passengers, supplies and mail to the dock located at the eastward-facing front of the inn. Parts of the original dock and stone stairway can still be seen while walking the current pier. Automobile access was available via ferry before Deception Pass Bridge was completed in 1935; Judge Still is credited with bringing the first automobile to Whidbey Island. The vehicle can still be seen at the Island County Historical Society Museum. Over time, the Inn has served as a general store, a girls' school, and a post office. The property returned to offering accommodations open to the public in 1946.

Present
Today, the inn appears very similar to the way it was when it was built. The original wood floors are still visible in both the lobby and the bar.  The large gathering room has become the dining room, kitchen, and Judge Still's Tavern. Over the years, electricity as well as Wi-Fi have been installed and upgraded throughout the building. The original inn now houses two suites and 10 regular rooms upstairs overlooking Penn cove and the gardens. The original cabins are now gone and have been replaced by four waterside cabins with private decks, views of Penn Cove and kitchens. The Lagoon Building houses 13 rooms that overlook the lagoon lawn and lagoon.   Each of these room has a unique style filled with rustic charm.   Guests can arrive either by car or, during the summer, at the inns dock by boat or float plane.

References

Bibliography
 Frommer's Washington State
 Access Seattle  By Rachel Clements, Dena Dawson
 The Best Recipes from America's Food Festivals  By James O. Fraioli
 Best Places Northwest: The Locals' Guide to the Best Restaurants, Lodgings ...  By Giselle Smith
 Writers' and Artists' Hideouts: Great Getaways for Seducing the Muse  By Andrea Brown
Lynn, Holly, et al. Images of America: Coupeville. Charleston, SC: Arcadia Publishing, 2012. Print.

External links
 Visitor's site

Buildings and structures in Island County, Washington
Hotel buildings on the National Register of Historic Places in Washington (state)
Hotels in Washington (state)
Tourist attractions in Island County, Washington
National Register of Historic Places in Island County, Washington
Historic district contributing properties in Washington (state)